The term Homo economicus, or economic man, is the portrayal of humans as agents who are consistently rational and narrowly self-interested, and who pursue their subjectively defined ends optimally. It is a word play on Homo sapiens, used in some economic theories and in pedagogy.

In game theory, Homo economicus is often modelled through the assumption of perfect rationality. It assumes that agents always act in a way that maximize utility as a consumer and profit as a producer, and are capable of arbitrarily complex deductions towards that end. They will always be capable of thinking through all possible outcomes and choosing that course of action which will result in the best possible result.

The rationality implied in Homo economicus does not restrict what sort of preferences are admissible. Only naive applications of the Homo economicus model assume that agents know what is best for their long-term physical and mental health. For example, an agent's utility function could be linked to the perceived utility of other agents (such as one's husband or children), making Homo economicus compatible with other models such as Homo reciprocans, which emphasizes human cooperation.

As a theory on human conduct, it contrasts to the concepts of behavioral economics, which examines cognitive biases and other irrationalities, and to bounded rationality, which assumes that practical elements such as cognitive and time limitations restrict the rationality of agents.

History of the term 

The term "economic man" was used for the first time in the late nineteenth century by critics of John Stuart Mill's work on political economy. Below is a passage from Mill's work that critics referred to:

[Political economy] does not treat the whole of man's nature as modified by the social state, nor of the whole conduct of man in society. It is concerned with him solely as a being who desires to possess wealth, and who is capable of judging the comparative efficacy of means for obtaining that end.

Later in the same work, Mill stated that he was proposing "an arbitrary definition of man, as a being who inevitably does that by which he may obtain the greatest amount of necessaries, conveniences, and luxuries, with the smallest quantity of labour and physical self-denial with which they can be obtained."

Adam Smith, in The Theory of Moral Sentiments, had claimed that individuals have sympathy for the well-being of others. On the other hand, in The Wealth of Nations, Smith wrote:

It is not from the benevolence of the butcher, the brewer, or the baker that we expect our dinner, but from their regard to their own interest.

This comment is perfectly in line with the notion of Homo economicus and the idea, propounded by Smith in The Wealth of Nations and, in the 20th century, by the likes of Ayn Rand (in The Virtue of Selfishness, for example), that pursuing narrow, individual self-interest promotes social well-being. In Book V, Chapter I, Smith argues, "The man whose whole life is spent in performing a few simple operations, of which the effects are perhaps always the same, or very nearly the same, has no occasion to exert his understanding or to exercise his invention in finding out expedients for removing difficulties which never occur. He naturally loses, therefore, the habit of such exertion, and generally becomes as stupid and ignorant as it is possible for a human creature to become." This could be seen as prefiguring one part of Marx's theory of alienation of labor; and also as a pro-worker argument against the division of labor and the restrictions it places upon freedom of occupation. But even so, taken in the context of the work as a whole, Smith clearly intends it in a pro-capitalism, pro-bourgeoisie, way: "removing difficulties", such as reducing the time needed for travel and trade, through "expedients", such as steam-engine ships, here means the typical argument that capitalism brings freedom of entrepreneurship and innovation, which then bring prosperity. Thus, Smith is not unreasonably called "The Father of Capitalism"; early on, he theorized many of today's most widespread and deep-seated pro-capitalism arguments.

The early role of Homo Economicus within neoclassical theory was summarised to include a general objective of discovering laws and principles to accelerate further growth within the national economy and the welfare of ordinary citizens. These laws and principles were determined by two governing factors, natural and social. It had been found to be the foundation of neoclassical theory of the firm which assumed that individual agents would act rationally amongst other rational individuals. In which Adam Smith explains that the actions of those that are rational and self-interested under homo economicus promotes the general good overall which was understood as the efficient allocation of material wealth. However, social scientists had doubted the actual importance of income and wealth to overall happiness in societies.  

The term had initially been used to criticise the nature of the economic agent that Smith and Mill had illustrated heavily in their writings. It had been stated that from an analytical perspective, Mill’s contribution to the development of Homo Economicus was one of great importance where he was able to define the political economy with differing aspects of production and the distribution of wealth. However, Adam Smith had been the first to demonstrate that under appropriate policies and an economic system that national prosperity could occur due to the selfishness of individuals.

Economists in the late 19th century—such as Francis Edgeworth, William Stanley Jevons, Léon Walras, and Vilfredo Pareto—built mathematical models on these economic assumptions. In the 20th century, the rational choice theory of Lionel Robbins came to dominate mainstream economics. The term "economic man" then took on a more specific meaning: a person who acted rationally on complete knowledge out of self-interest and the desire for wealth.

Model 

Homo economicus is a term used for an approximation or model of Homo sapiens that acts to obtain the highest possible well-being for themself given available information about opportunities and other constraints, both natural and institutional, on their ability to achieve their predetermined goals. This approach has been formalized in certain social sciences models, particularly in economics.

Homo economicus is seen as "rational" in the sense that well-being as defined by the utility function is optimized given perceived opportunities. That is, the individual seeks to attain very specific and predetermined goals to the greatest extent with the least possible cost. Note that this kind of "rationality" does not say that the individual's actual goals are "rational" in some larger ethical, social, or human sense, only that they try to attain them at minimal cost. Only naïve applications of the Homo economicus model assume that this hypothetical individual knows what is best for their long-term physical and mental health and can be relied upon to always make the right decision for themself. See rational choice theory and rational expectations for further discussion; the article on rationality widens the discussion.

As in social science, these assumptions are at best approximations. The term is often used derogatorily in academic literature, perhaps most commonly by sociologists, many of whom tend to prefer structural explanations to ones based on rational action by individuals.

The use of the Latin form Homo economicus is certainly long established; Persky traces it back to Pareto (1906) but notes that it may be older. The English term economic man can be found even earlier, in John Kells Ingram's A History of Political Economy (1888).  The Oxford English Dictionary (O.E.D.) cites the use of Homo oeconomicus by C. S. Devas in his 1883 work The Groundwork of Economics in reference to Mill's writings, as one of a number of phrases that imitate the scientific name for the human species:

According to the OED, the human genus name Homo is

Note that such forms should logically keep the capital for the "genus" name—i.e., Homo economicus rather than homo economicus. Actual usage is inconsistent.

Amartya Sen has argued there are grave pitfalls in assuming that rationality is limited to selfish rationality. Economics should build into its assumptions the notion that people can give credible commitments to a course of conduct. He demonstrates the absurdity with the narrowness of the assumptions by some economists with the following example of two strangers meeting on a street.

Criticisms 

Homo economicus bases its choices on a consideration of its own personal "utility function".

Consequently, the Homo economicus assumptions have been criticized not only by economists on the basis of logical arguments, but also on empirical grounds by cross-cultural comparison. Economic anthropologists such as Marshall Sahlins, Karl Polanyi, Marcel Mauss and Maurice Godelier have demonstrated that in traditional societies, choices people make regarding production and exchange of goods follow patterns of reciprocity which differ sharply from what the Homo economicus model postulates. Such systems have been termed gift economy rather than market economy. Criticisms of the Homo economicus model put forward from the standpoint of ethics usually refer to this traditional ethic of kinship-based reciprocity that held together traditional societies. Philosophers Amartya Sen and Axel Honneth are noted for their criticisms of the normative assumptions made by the self-interested utility function.

Economists Thorstein Veblen, John Maynard Keynes, Herbert A. Simon, and many of the Austrian School criticise Homo economicus as an actor with too great an understanding of macroeconomics and economic forecasting in his decision making. They stress uncertainty and bounded rationality in the making of economic decisions, rather than relying on the rational man who is fully informed of all circumstances impinging on his decisions. They argue that perfect knowledge never exists, which means that all economic activity implies risk. Austrian economists rather prefer to use as a model tool the Homo agens.

Empirical studies by Amos Tversky questioned the assumption that investors are rational. In 1995, Tversky demonstrated the tendency of investors to make risk-averse choices in gains, and risk-seeking choices in losses. The investors appeared as very risk-averse for small losses but indifferent for a small chance of a very large loss. This violates economic rationality as usually understood. Further research on this subject, showing other deviations from conventionally defined economic rationality, is being done in the growing field of experimental or behavioral economics. Some of the broader issues involved in this criticism are studied in decision theory, of which rational choice theory is only a subset.

Behavioral economists Richard Thaler and Daniel Kahneman have criticized the notion of economic agents possessing stable and well-defined preferences that they consistently act upon in a self-interested manner. Using insights from psychological experiments found explanations for anomalies in economic decision-making that seemed to violate rational choice theory. Writing a column in the Journal of Economic Perspectives under the title Anomalies, Thaler wrote features on the many ways observed economic behavior in markets deviated from theory. One such anomaly was the endowment effect by which individual preferences are framed based on reference positions (Kahneman et al., 1990). In an experiment in which one group was given a mug and the other was asked how much they were willing to pay (WTP) for the mug, it was found that the price that those endowed with the mug where willingness to accept (WTA) greatly exceeded that of the WTP. This was seen as falsifying the Coase theorem in which for every person the WTA equals the WTP that is the basis of the efficient-market hypothesis. From this they argued the endowment effect acts on us by making it painful for us to give up the endowment. Kahneman also argued against the rational-agent model in which agents make decisions with all of the relevant context including weighing all possible future opportunities and risks. Evidence supports the claim that decisions are often made by "narrow framing" with investors making portfolio decisions in isolation from their entire portfolio (Nicholas Barberis et al., 2003). Shlomo Benartzi and Thaler found that investors also tended to use unreasonable time periods in evaluating their investments. 

In Kahneman-Tversky’s criticism of the Homo Economicus model, many mainstream economists had utilised deductive logic to further progress the Homo Economicus idea as opposed to Daniel Kahneman and Amos Tversky in which they had applied inductive logic.  Further findings of their experiments that opposed Homo Economicus had found that individuals will constantly adjust their choices according to changes in their income and market prices.  Furthermore, Kahneman and Tversky had conducted experiments exploring prospect theory where results from several experiments concluded that individuals will generally put higher importance on avoiding loss over making a gain.

Other critics of the Homo economicus model of humanity, such as Bruno Frey, point to the excessive emphasis on extrinsic motivation (rewards and punishments from the social environment) as opposed to intrinsic motivation. For example, it is difficult if not impossible to understand how Homo economicus would be a hero in war or would get inherent pleasure from craftsmanship. Frey and others argue that too much emphasis on rewards and punishments can "crowd out" (discourage) intrinsic motivation: paying a boy for doing household tasks may push him from doing those tasks "to help the family" to doing them simply for the reward.

Another weakness is highlighted by economic sociologists and anthropologists, who argue that Homo economicus ignores an extremely important question, i.e. the origins of tastes and the parameters of the utility function by social influences, training, education, and the like. The exogeneity of tastes (preferences) in this model is the major distinction from Homo sociologicus, in which tastes are taken as partially or even totally determined by the societal environment (see below).

Further critics, learning from the broadly defined psychoanalytic tradition, criticize the Homo economicus model as ignoring the inner conflicts that real-world individuals suffer, as between short-term and long-term goals (e.g., eating chocolate cake and losing weight) or between individual goals and societal values. Such conflicts may lead to "irrational" behavior involving inconsistency, psychological paralysis, neurosis, and psychic pain. Further irrational human behaviour can occur as a result of habit, laziness, mimicry and simple obedience.

The emerging science of "neuroeconomics" suggests that there are serious shortcomings in the conventional theories of economic rationality. Rational economic decision making has been shown to produce high levels of cortisol, epinephrine and corticosteroids, associated with elevated levels of stress.  It seems that the dopaminic system is only activated upon achieving the reward, and otherwise the "pain" receptors, particularly in the prefrontal cortex of the left hemisphere of the brain show a high level of activation.  Serotonin and oxytocin levels are minimised, and the general immune system shows a level of suppression.  Such a pattern is associated with a generalised reduction in the levels of trust.  Unsolicited "gift giving", considered irrational from the point of view of Homo economicus, by comparison, shows an elevated stimulation of the pleasure circuits of the whole brain, reduction in the levels of stress, optimal functioning of the immune system, reduction in cortico-steroids and epinephrine and cortisol, activation of the substantia nigra, the striatum and the nucleus accumbens (associated with the placebo effect), all associated with the building of social trust.  Mirror neurons result in a win-win positive sum game in which the person giving the gift receives a pleasure equivalent to the person receiving it. This confirms the findings of anthropology which suggest that a "gift economy" preceded the more recent market systems where win-lose or risk-avoidance lose-lose calculations apply.

Responses 

Economists  tend to disagree with these critiques, arguing that it may be relevant to analyze the consequences of enlightened egoism just as it may be worthwhile to consider altruistic or social behavior. Others  argue that we need to understand the consequences of such narrow-minded greed even if only a small percentage of the population embraces such motives. Free riders, for example, would have a major negative impact on the provision of public goods. However, economists' supply and demand predictions might obtain even if only a significant minority of market participants act like Homo economicus. In this view, the assumption of Homo economicus can and should be simply a preliminary step on the road to a more sophisticated model.

Yet others argue that Homo economicus is a reasonable approximation for behavior within market institutions, since the individualized nature of human action in such social settings encourages individualistic behavior. Not only do market settings encourage the application of a simple cost-benefit calculus by individuals, but they reward and thus attract the more individualistic people. It can be difficult to apply social values (as opposed to following self-interest) in an extremely competitive market; a company that refuses to pollute, for example, may find itself bankrupt.

Defenders of the Homo economicus model see many critics of the dominant school as using a straw man technique. For example, it is common for critics to argue that real people do not have cost-less access to infinite information and an innate ability to instantly process it . However, in advanced-level theoretical economics, scholars have found ways of addressing these problems, modifying models enough to more realistically depict real-life decision-making. For example, models of individual behavior under bounded rationality and of people suffering from envy can be found in the literature. It is primarily when targeting the limiting assumptions made in constructing undergraduate models that the criticisms listed above are valid. These criticisms are especially valid to the extent that the professor asserts that the simplifying assumptions are true or uses them in a propagandistic way.

The more sophisticated economists are quite conscious of the empirical limitations of the Homo economicus model. In theory, the views of the critics can be combined with the Homo economicus model to attain a more accurate model.

Perspectives 

According to Sergio Caruso, when talking of Homo economicus, one should distinguish between the purely "methodological" versions, aimed at practical use in the economic sphere (e.g. economic calculus), and the" anthropological" versions, more ambitiously aimed at depicting a certain type of man (supposed to be actually existing), or even human nature in general. The former, traditionally founded on a merely speculative psychology, have proved unrealistic and frankly wrong as descriptive models of economic behaviour (therefore not applicable for normative purposes either); however, they are liable to be corrected resorting to the new empirically based economic psychology, which turns quite other than the philosophers' psychology that economists have used until yesterday. Among the latter (i.e. the anthropological versions), one can make a further distinction between the weak versions, more plausible, and the strong ones, irreparably ideological. Depicting different types of "economic man" (each depending on the social context) is in fact possible with the help of cultural anthropology, and social psychology (a branch of psychology economists have strangely ignored), if only those types are contrived as socially and/or historically determined abstractions (such as Weber's, Korsch's, and Fromm's concepts of Idealtypus, "historical specification", and "social character"). Even a Marxist theoretician such as Gramsci—reminds Caruso—admitted of the Homo economicus as a useful abstraction on the ground of economic theory, provided that we grant there be as many homines oeconomici as the modes of production. On the contrary, when one concept of Homo economicus claims to grasp the eternal essence of what is human, at the same time putting aside all other aspects of human nature (such as Homo faber, Homo loquens, Homo ludens, Homo reciprocans, and so on), then the concept leaves the field of good philosophy, not to speak of social science, and is ready to enter a political doctrine as the most dangerous of its ideological ingredients.

Homo sociologicus 

Comparisons between economics and sociology have resulted in a corresponding term Homo sociologicus (introduced by German sociologist Ralf Dahrendorf in 1958), to parody the image of human nature given in some sociological models that attempt to limit the social forces that determine individual tastes and social values. (The alternative or additional source of these would be biology.) Hirsch et al. say that Homo sociologicus is largely a tabula rasa upon which societies and cultures write values and goals; unlike economicus, sociologicus acts not to pursue selfish interests but to fulfill social roles (though the fulfillment of social roles may have a selfish rationale—e.g. politicians or socialites). This "individual" may appear to be all society and no individual.

See also

Notes

References 

 J.S. Mill, 'On the Definition of Political Economy, and on the Method of Investigation Proper to It' (1836) London and Westminster Review
 J.S. Mill, Essays on Some Unsettled Questions of Political Economy (2nd ed. Longmans, Green, Reader & Dyer 1874) (read online)
 A.K. Sen, ‘Rational Fools: A Critique of the Behavioural Foundations of Economic Theory’ (1977) 6 Philosophy and Public Affairs 317

External links 

 Self-Interest, Homo Islamicus and Some Behavioral Assumptions in Islamic Economics and Finance (DOC) by Dr. Mohammad Omar Farooq
 Requiem for Homo Economicus Edward J. O'Boyle, Mayo Research Institute, a refutation of reductionism in free will using tenets of natural law

Behavioral economics
Economic methodology
Latin philosophical phrases
Rational choice theory
Game theory